Aloa lactinea, the red costate tiger moth, is a moth of family Erebidae. The species was first described by Pieter Cramer in 1777. It is found in India, Japan, southern and western China, Taiwan, Java, Sumatra, Sri Lanka, Myanmar and the Philippines.

Description

Its wingspan is about 40 mm long. The abdomen is yellow. Antennae black with a scarlet basal joint. Palpi scarlet at sides, white below, the terminal joint black. Head white with a crimson line behind it. Thorax white. Wings primarily white. Forewings with a scarlet fascia along the costa. Red markings are with a deep crimson tone. The band on the head is broader. A black speck at each angle of cell present, but some absent. Hindwings with a black spot at end of cell and a sub-marginal series of four, the two towards anal angle sometimes absent. Larva black with lateral tufts of reddish-brown hair. A sub-dorsal series of scarlet spots present. Dorsal, sub-dorsal, and lateral series of black spots also present. Somites 1st, 3rd, 4th and 5th with sub-lateral spots. Two spots only on the 11th somite.

Ecology
The species is found in primary and secondary habitats ranging from the lowlands to montane regions. It is a minor pest. The caterpillar feeds on castor, coffee, jute, groundnut, teak, ragi, sunflower, maize, finger millet, sweet potato, and beans.

References

Spilosomina
Moths described in 1777
Moths of Asia
insect pests of millets